Sclerotinia minor (white mold) is a plant pathogen infecting Chicory, Radicchio, carrots, tomatoes, sunflowers, peanuts and lettuce.

References

External links
 Index Fungorum
 USDA ARS Fungal Database

Fungal plant pathogens and diseases
Carrot diseases
Tomato diseases
Lettuce diseases
Sclerotiniaceae
Fungi described in 1920